Hariharan Anantha Subramani (born 3 April 1955) is an Indian playback, bhajan and ghazal singer who predominantly sings in Tamil, Hindi and Telugu languages. He has also sung over 15,000 notable songs in 10 regional languages including Malayalam, Kannada, Marathi, Sinhala and Bhojpuri. He is an established ghazal singer and one of the pioneers of Indian fusion music. 

In 2004, he was honoured with the Padma Shri by the Government of India and is a two-time National Award winner. Hariharan, associating with Lesle Lewis, formed Colonial Cousins, a two-member band. They have cut many private music albums and also scored music for few feature films in Tamil and Hindi. On 9 October 2021 at 13:47, Hariharan and late Gulshan Kumar's Hanuman Chalisa recorded under the label of T-Series crossed the 2-billion views mark on YouTube, making it the first devotional song in the world to do so.

Personal life and education 
Hariharan was born to classical musicians H A S Mani and Alamelu Mani. HAS Mani - he was affectionately called Chellamani - groomed many Carnatic singers in Mumbai where he died in his early 40s due to cardiac arrest in 1963. His mother Alamelu Mani (b 1935) has had a long career as Carnatic vocalist and a distinguished teacher, and was honoured with the title Sangeeta Pracharya in 2019. Hariharan did his schooling at Don Bosco High School, Matunga and graduated from SIES College of Arts, Science & Commerce, Mumbai. Thereafter he pursued his studies at the St. Xavier's College, Mumbai.

Career

Film career

At the start of his career, Hariharan did the concert circuit and also performed on TV. He sang for a number of TV serials (e.g., Junoon). In 1977, he won the top prize in the "All India Sur Singaar Competition" and was promptly signed on by the late music director Jaidev to sing for his new Hindi film Gaman (1978). His debut song "Ajeeb Sa neha Mujh Par Guzar gaya yaaron" in that movie became such a hit that it won him an Uttar Pradesh State Film Award, as well as a National Award nomination.

Hariharan entered the world of Tamil films in 1992 introduced by debutant music director A.R. Rahman with the patriotic song "Thamizha Thamizha" in Maniratnam's film Roja. He was judged best male playback singer in the 1995 Tamil Nadu State Government Film Awards for his soulful rendition of the song "Uyire Uyire" also by music director A.R Rahman in Maniratnam's Bombay (Hariharan sang the song with K.S. Chithra). Hariharan has been one of the most trusted singers of Rahman and has sung many songs for him in long list of movies that includes Muthu, Minsara Kanavu, Jeans, Indian, Mudhalvan, Taal, Rangeela, Indira, Iruvar, Anbe Aaruyire, Kangalal Kaithu Sei, Sivaji, Alaipayuthey, Kannathil Muthamittal, Guru, Enthiran etc. He composed music for the Indo Polish FilmNo Means No. In 1998, Hariharan won the national award for the best playback singer for the soulful rendition of the song "Mere Dushman Mere Bhai" from the Hindi movie Border, composed by Anu Malik. Hariharan got another National Award for the Marathi song "Jiv Rangla" from Jogwa, set to tune by Ajay Atul in the year 2009.

He has sung more than 500 Tamil songs and nearly 200 Hindi songs. He has also sung hundreds of songs in Malayalam, Telugu, Kannada, Marathi, Bengali and Odia languages. Hariharan has acted in a Tamil film with Khushbu, Power of Women (2005), and played cameo roles in the Tamil film Boys and the Malayalam film Millennium Stars.

Ghazals
Hariharan is one of the foremost Indian ghazal singers and composers with more than thirty albums to his credit. In his early career, he cut several successful ghazal albums, writing most of the scores himself. One of Hariharan's first ghazal albums was Aabshar-e-Ghazal with Asha Bhosle, which went gold in sales.

Another outstanding ghazal album was Gulfam, which not only hit double platinum in sales but also fetched Hariharan the Diva Award for the Best Album of the Year in 1995.

The other major ghazal albums by him are Hazir (1992), Jashn (1996), Halka Nasha (1996), Paigham (1997), Kaash (2000), and Lahore Ke Rang Hari Ke Sang (2005). His live concert recordings, Hariharan in Concert (1990), Saptarishi (1996) and Swar Utsav (2001) were run away successes. His latest ghazal album is Lafzz... (2008). Hariharan worked with tabla maestro Zakir Hussain on his album Hazir.

The album Lahore Ke Rang Hari Ke Sang won rave reviews and critical acclaim inside and outside India. A.R. Rahman was an avid listener of his ghazals way before roping him in to sing his first song in Tamil film music, "Thamizha Thamizha", for the film Roja.

Colonial Cousins

The year 1996 was a career milestone; he formed the band Colonial Cousins with Mumbai-based composer and singer Lesle Lewis. Their first album, Colonial Cousins was a fusion album and was the first Indian act to be featured on MTV Unplugged. It won a string of awards including the MTV Indian Viewers' Choice award and Billboard Award for the Best Asian Music Group.

By this single album, Hariharan established himself as one of the pioneers of Indian fusion music. The next albums by this band were The Way We Do It (1998) and Aatma (2001) but were fairly noticed. Colonial Cousins released their fourth studio album "Once More" on 29 October 2012 under the label Universal. The 2009 Tamil film Modhi Vilayadu had score and soundtrack composed by Colonial Cousins. They also scored the 2010 Tamil film Chikku Bukku.

Recent years
In 2004, he was awarded the Padma Shri and Yesudas Award for his outstanding performance in music.

Hariharan collaborated with Pakistan based band Strings for a track called "Bolo Bolo". He released an album called Destiny with Punjabi/bhangra artist Daler Mehndi.

He coined the terminology "Urdu Blues" with his fairly successful album Kaash which featured musicians like Anandan Sivamani the percussion maestro, Ustad Rashid Mustafa on tabla, Ustad Liyaqat Ali Khan on sitar and Ustad Sultan Khan on sarangi.

He also performed the Swagatham song in the 2010 Commonwealth Games opening ceremony held in New Delhi on 3 October.

During 2010–2011, he appeared in a music show in Jaya TV named Hariyudan Naan which was aired every Thursday, Friday and Saturday.

Hariharan collaborated with Sarangan Sriranganathan for "Sruthi" at the Sydney Hill Centre and the Melbourne Robert Blackwood Hall Australia in 2011 He unofficially released ghazal singer Adithya Srinivasan's first international single 'Gham e Duniya' at the Gateway Hotel, Bangalore. In an interview in 2012, he said that he was no longer receiving offers to sing for Bollywood as music composers wanted to experiment with singers from the younger generation.
 
He was selected as judge for Asianet Star Singer Season 6 programme, a very popular music contest television show for upcoming singers in Malayalam. Hariharan was a part of the 'Royal Stag Barrel Select MTV Unplugged', aired in December 2015.

Major awards
 Civilian Awards
 2004 – Padma Shri

 National Film Awards
 1998 – National Film Award for Best Male Playback Singer: "Mere Dushman", Border 2009 – National Film Award for Best Male Playback Singer: "Jeev Dangla Gungla Rangla", JogwaKerala State Film Awards
 2011 – Kerala State Film Award for Best Singer – for the song "Pattu Paaduvaan" in the film "Pattinte Palazhi" music by Dr. Suresh Manimala

 Swaralaya-Kairali-Yesudas Award
 2004 –  For his outstanding contribution to Indian film music

 Tamil Nadu State Film Awards
 2004 – Best Male Playback Singer – for various films
 1995 – Best Male Playback Singer – for the song "Koncha Naal" in the film Aasai Nandi Awards
 1999 – Best Male Playback Singer – for the song "Hima Semalloyallo" in the film Annayya Asianet Film Awards
 2012 – Best Male Playback Singer – for Amrithamayi from Snehaveedu 2011 – Best Male Playback Singer – for "Aaro Padunnu" from Katha Thudarunnu Kalakar Awards-
 8th Kalakar Awards 2000 – for Best Male Playback Singer

 Filmfare Awards South-
 2011 – Best Male Playback Singer – for "Aaro Padunnu" from Katha Thudarunnu Vijay Awards-
 2009 – Best Male Playback Singer – for "Nenjukkul Peithidum" from Vaaranam AayiramTelevision
 Reality show as Judge

DiscographyAabshar-e-GhazalAathwan Sur – The Other Side of NaushadColonial CousinsDil Aisa Kisi Ne Mera TodaDil Ki BaatDil NasheenGhazal Ka MausamGulfamHalka NashaHariharan - Down the YearsHariharan in ConcertHorizonIntoxicating HariharanJashnKaashKuch Door Hamare SaathLafzz...Lahore Ke Rang Hari Ke SangMagic MomentsPaighamQaraarReflectionsSaptarishiSwar UtsavSukoonThe Great GhazalsThe Very Best of Hariharan GhazalsVisaal – Ghazals for ConnoisseursWaqt Par Bolna Albums by Colonial CousinsColonial Cousins – MTV UnpluggedColonial Cousins – The Way We Do ItColonial Cousins – AatmaModhi Vilayadu (soundtrack album)Chikku Bukku (soundtrack album)Colonial Cousins – Once MoreFeatured albumsJana Gana Mana – by A.R. Rahman1995 Meghutam – The Cloud Messenger (Pt. Vishwamohan Bhatt)2000 Sartaj2002 Tum Aaye2004 Dhaani2008 Tum Jo Mile2009 Lajwaab – Tribute to Medi HasanAsha wali DhoopChand Ke Saath2011 Hasrat2011 Sarhadein: Music Beyond Boundaries2014 JIL (Just In Love): Music By Dr. Kelvin Jeyakanth''

References

External links

Sai, Veejay (4 October 2012) Success… on his terms. The Hindu

1955 births
Bhajan singers
Filmfare Awards South winners
Indian male playback singers
Indian male ghazal singers
Kannada playback singers
Living people
Malayalam playback singers
Marathi playback singers
Marathi-language singers
Singers from Mumbai
Singers from Thiruvananthapuram
Recipients of the Padma Shri in arts
Sa Re Ga Ma Pa participants
Tamil musicians
Tamil Nadu State Film Awards winners
Tamil playback singers
Telugu playback singers
Recipients of the Kalaimamani Award
Film musicians from Kerala
Best Male Playback Singer National Film Award winners
Screen Awards winners